The Heimkehrerdenkmal (Monument to Homecomers) is a monument in Friedland, Germany, dedicated to German prisoners of war during the Second World War. It is significant as one of the only monuments in Germany dedicated to Germans who served as soldiers in the war. The monument was commissioned by the Verband der Heimkehrer, Kriegsgefangenen und Vermisstenangehörigen Deutschlands (Federation of Homecomers, POWs and Relatives of the Missing - VdH), which was founded in 1950 to represent the interests of German veterans. When the monument was inaugurated in 1967, representatives of the German federal government declined to attend because of the monument's controversial focus on German victimhood. The monument has been subject to vandalism, including graffiti referring to German concentration camps.

References 

Monuments and memorials in Germany
World War II memorials in Germany
Outdoor sculptures in Germany
Göttingen (district)